Karl Bögelein (28 January 1927 – 9 August 2016) was a German football goalkeeper and coach.

Honours
With VfB Stuttgart:
German Champion (1952)
DFB-Pokal (1954)

External links 
 Karl Bögelein at kicker.de 
 

1927 births
2016 deaths
German footballers
Association football goalkeepers
Germany international footballers
VfB Stuttgart players
SSV Reutlingen 05 players
German football managers
VfB Stuttgart managers
Bundesliga managers
VfB Stuttgart II managers
Sportspeople from Bamberg
Footballers from Bavaria
West German footballers
West German football managers